The East Bay Bike Path is a  paved rail trail in Rhode Island. The path begins in Providence and India Point Park, crosses the Seekonk River via the George Redman Linear Park (opened September 2015) and Washington Bridge and continues southeast to Bristol along the shoreline of Narragansett Bay. The path passes through the city of East Providence, the hamlet of Riverside, and the towns of Barrington and Warren. It is part of the East Coast Greenway, a 3,000-mile system of trails connecting the Canada–US border in Maine to Key West. and provides access to Haines State Park, Brickyard Pond (Barrington), and  Colt State Park. It is used annually by 1.1 million people.

History 

The East Bay Bike Path was originally part of the Providence, Warren and Bristol Railroad which opened in 1855 to take trains from Providence to Bristol, Rhode Island. The line changed hands several times through the years, eventually falling under the ownership of the New York, New Haven & Hartford railroad. In 1900 the line was electrified and adopted a rapid-transit model of service until 1934. All passenger service was discontinued in 1937. 

In 1970, Penn Central requested ICC permission to abandon the line from Providence to Bristol. The Crook Point Bascule Bridge and East Side Tunnel were abandoned by Conrail in 1976; the line was now only accessible via the East Providence Branch and the East Junction Branch. The rest of the branch was officially abandoned by the Providence and Worcester in 1976 due to low freight demand. In 1981, the Rhode Island Department of Transportation briefly considered restoring passenger service to the PW&B right-of-way as a state-subsidized commuter rail line; this proposed service was precluded following the realignment of the Northeast Corridor later in the 1980s. Despite having been out of service by trains for 45+ years, tracks still remain along many parts of the old route as the trail in some places was constructed beside the right-of-way, rather than on top. 

The plan for Rhode Island's first major bike path was approved in April 1983 by Governor Edward DiPrete. It was built between 1987 and 1992, following the abandoned rail bed of the Providence, Warren and Bristol Railroad. The property was acquired and constructed in four phases:

 Riverside Square to Barrington County Road
 County Road, Barrington to Franklin Street, Warren
 Franklin Street, Warren to Independence Park, Bristol
 Riverside Square to India Point Park, Providence

The completed path was dedicated on May 31, 1992 by Governor Bruce Sundlun. An 8.5 mile on-road bike lane was completed in 2011, linking the East Bay Bike Path with the south tip of the Blackstone River Bikeway, a  trail that will link Providence with Worcester, Massachusetts. Rhode Island's next project will be connecting the East Bay Bike Path with the Washington Secondary Rail Trail.

Repairs and upgrade
Tree roots, erosion, and weather necessitated repairs to the asphalt in 2002, 2007, and 2009. Repairs in mid-2016 targeted the most hazardous areas of the path. Pavement was repaired, destructive tree roots removed, eroded areas reinforced, and new planks were installed on the Barrington bridges. 

A section of the bike path was renovated and rebuilt along the Washington Bridge between 2012 and 2015. The park was christened the George Redman Linear Park, opened in September 2015 at a total cost of $21.8 million. It consists of an 11-foot wide bicycle lane, a separated footpath paved with stamped concrete, and several seating areas and is completely separated from I-195 automobile traffic. It was named in honor of East Providence cyclist George Redman. A plaque honoring Redman can be seen on the west end of the park.

The advanced deterioration of structural elements of the 1900 railroad trestles carrying the Bike Path over the Barrington and Palmer Rivers necessitated their closure in November 2019. The Rhode Island Department of Transportation (RIDOT) had allocated $10 million for their replacement. As of Spring 2021, the estimated costs rose to as much as $25 million. RIDOT in 2021 invested $2 million to build a temporary continuous detour using boardwalks on the north side of the Route 114 vehicular bridges across the rivers until a permanent solution could be found. RIDOT in late 2021 also issued a request for proposals (RFP) design-build procurement for replacing the bridges. In 2022, Senators Jack Reed and Sheldon Whitehouse provided a total of $14 million ($5 million in March and another $9 million in August) in additional funding toward the project. RIDOT hosted a groundbreaking ceremony for the $24 million design-build project on September 26, 2022 to replace both bridges using an approach that limits shoreline impacts and does not affect nearby utilities. The project is scheduled to be done by the end of 2025.

Route 

 India Point Park, Providence (terminus) - formerly a rail yard for Boston and Providence Railroad
 Washington Bridge over Seekonk River
 Street running along 1st Street, East Providence
 Follows Veterans Memorial Parkway, developed by the Rhode Island Metropolitan Park Commission
 Bold Point Park / Fort Hill, East Providence
 Transition to former right-of-way of Providence, Warren and Bristol Railroad for remainder of route
 Squantum Woods Park, East Providence, next to the Squantum Association, which grew out of a 19th century tradition of men's groups putting on clam bakes
 Exxon-Mobil terminal for oil tankers
 Pomham Rocks Light
 East Providence Water Pollution Control Plant (sewage treatment), serving East Providence and Barrington
 Haines Memorial State Park, Barrington
 Bridge over Barrington River (rerouted to temporary dedicated bridge as of summer 2022)
 Bridge over Palmer River (rerouted to temporary dedicated bridge as of summer 2022)
 Burr's Hill Park, Warren
 Claire D. McIntosh Wildlife Refuge, Bristol
 Colt State Park, Bristol
 Independence Park, Bristol (terminus)

Gallery

References

External links 

 
 East Bay Bike Path Rhode Island Department of Environmental Management Parks and Recreations Division
 East Bay Bike Path Rhode Island Department of Transportation (with map)
 East Coast Greenway Greenways Alliance of Rhode Island

Barrington, Rhode Island
Bristol, Rhode Island
East Providence, Rhode Island
Tourist attractions in Providence, Rhode Island
Rail trails in Rhode Island
State parks of Rhode Island
East Coast Greenway
Warren, Rhode Island
Protected areas of Providence County, Rhode Island
Protected areas established in 1992
1992 establishments in Rhode Island